Kootenay East (also known as Kootenay East—Revelstoke) was a federal electoral district in British Columbia, Canada, that was represented in the House of Commons of Canada from 1917 to 1968 and from 1979 to 1997.

This riding was created as "Kootenay East" in 1914 from parts of Kootenay riding.

It was abolished in 1966 when it was redistributed into Kootenay West and Okanagan—Kootenay ridings.

It initially consisted of the provincial electoral districts of Cranbrook, Fernie and Columbia.

Its boundaries were adjusted in 1924, 1933, and 1947.

It was recreated in 1976 as "Kootenay East" from parts of Kootenay West and Okanagan—Kootenay ridings, and consisted of:
 the East Kootenay Regional District;
 the southeast part of the Central Kootenay Regional District; and
 the eastern part of the Columbia-Shuswap Regional District lying east of Electoral Areas C and E.

The name of the electoral district was changed in 1977 to "Kootenay East—Revelstoke".

The electoral district was abolished in 1987 when it was redistributed into a new Kootenay East riding and Kootenay West—Revelstoke.

The new Kootenay East riding consisted of:
 the East Kootenay Regional District;
 Electoral Areas A, B and C of the Central Kootenay Regional District;
 the Town of Creston;
 Electoral Area A of the Columbia-Shuswap Regional District; and
 the town of Golden.

The electoral district was abolished in 1996 when it was redistributed into Kootenay—Columbia.

Members of Parliament

Election results

Kootenay East, 1988–1997

Kootenay East—Revelstoke, 1979–1988

Kootenay East, 1917–1968

See also 

 List of Canadian federal electoral districts
 Past Canadian electoral districts

External links

Riding history from the] Library of Parliament
(1914–1966)
(1976–1977)
KOOTENAY EAST--REVELSTOKE, British Columbia (1977–1987)
(1987–1996)

Former federal electoral districts of British Columbia